Meson is a software tool for automating the building (compiling) of software. The overall goal for Meson is to promote programmer productivity. Meson is free and open-source software written in Python, under the Apache License 2.0.

Interoperability 
Being written in Python, Meson runs on Unix-like operating systems, including macOS, as well as Microsoft Windows and on other operating systems.

Meson supports the C, C++, CUDA, D, Objective-C, Fortran, Java, C#, Rust, and Vala languages, and has a mechanism for handling dependencies called Wrap.

Meson supports GNU Compiler Collection, Clang, Microsoft Visual C++ and other compilers, including non-traditional compilers such as Emscripten and Cython. The project uses ninja as the primary backend buildsystem, but can also use Microsoft Visual Studio or Xcode backends.

Language 
The syntax of Meson's build description files (the Meson language) borrows from Python, but is not Python: It is designed such that it can be reimplemented in any other language; for example, muon is a C implementation and Meson++ is a C++ implementation – the dependency on Python is an implementation detail.

The Meson language is intentionally not Turing complete, and can therefore not express an arbitrary program. Instead, arbitrary build steps beyond compiling supported languages can be represented as custom targets.

The Meson language is strongly typed, such that builtin types like library, executable, string, and lists thereof, are non-interchangeable. In particular, unlike Make, the list type does not split strings on whitespace. Thus, whitespace and other characters in filenames and program arguments are handled cleanly.

Speed and correctness 
As with any typical buildsystem, correct incremental builds is the most significant speed feature (because all incremental progress is discarded whenever the user is forced to do a clean build).

Unlike bare Make, the separate configure step ensures that changes to arguments, environment variables and command output are not partially applied in subsequent builds, which would lead to a stale build.

Like Ninja, Meson does not support globbing of source files. By requiring all source files to be listed in the build definition files, the build definition file timestamps are sufficient to determine if the set of source files has changed, thereby ensuring that removed source files are detected. CMake supports globbing, but recommends against it for the same reason.

Meson uses ccache automatically if installed. It also detects changes to symbol tables of shared libraries to skip relinking executables against the library when there are no ABI changes. Precompiled headers are supported, but requires configuration. Debug builds are without optimization by default.

Features 
A stated goal of Meson is to facilitate modern development practices. As such, Meson knows how to do unity builds, build with test coverage, link time optimization etc without the programmer having to write support for this.

Subprojects 
Meson can automatically find and use external dependencies via pkg-config, CMake, and project-specific lookups, but this only finds installed dependencies, which Meson can not do anything about.
Alternatively, or as a fallback, a dependency can be provided as a subproject – a Meson project within another, either contained or as a download link, possibly with patches. This lets Meson resolve dependency hell for the convenience of casual users who want to compile the project, but may contribute to software bloat if a common installed dependency could have been used instead. The mode favored by Linux packagers is therefore fallback.

Meson supports Meson and CMake subprojects. A Meson build file may also refer to the WrapDB service.

Comparison of dependency resolution use cases in different build systems

Cross compilation 
Cross compilation requires extra configuration, which Meson supports in the form of a separate cross file, which can be external to the Meson project.

Adopters 

GNOME has made it a goal to port its projects to Meson. As of late 2017, GNOME Shell itself exclusively requires Meson after abandoning Autotools, and central components like GTK+, Clutter-GTK, GLib and GStreamer can be built with Meson.

Many freedesktop.org projects have switched to Meson.  Systemd relies on Meson since dropping Autotools in version 234, and also X.Org and Mesa were ported to Meson.

Meson can also be used as a PEP517 backend to build Python wheels, via the  package.

Other notable projects using Meson include QEMU and Libvirt; the Meson homepage lists further projects using Meson.

See also

References

External links 
 

Build automation
Compiling tools
Free software programmed in Python
Meson build system
Software using the Apache license